Sabu Raijua Regency is one of the regencies in the province of East Nusa Tenggara, Indonesia.  It comprises the three Savu Islands, lying between Sumba and Rote Island in the Savu Sea. The regency was established by Indonesia's Minister of Home Affairs, Mardiyanto, on 29 October 2008, partitioned from Kupang Regency. The population was 72,960 at the 2010 census, and 89,327 at the 2020 Census; the official estimate as at mid 2021 was 90,837.

Administration 
The regency is divided into six districts (kecamatan), tabulated below with their areas and their populations at the 2010 Census and 2020 Census, together with the official estimates as at miud 2021. Note all districts are on Sabu Island except for Raijua District, which encompasses Rai Jua or Raijua Island (37.27 km2) and uninhabited Rai Dana Island (0.89 km2) The table also includes the location of the district administrative centres, the number of administrative villages (rural desa and urban kelurahan) in each district, and its post code.

References

Regencies of East Nusa Tenggara